The 1977–78 Portland Trail Blazers season was the eighth season of the Portland Trail Blazers in the National Basketball Association (NBA). Fresh off their first NBA Championship win the previous season, the Blazers led the league with a franchise-best 58–24 record, earning a first-round bye in the 1978 NBA Playoffs.  However, they were defeated by the eventual Western Conference champion Seattle SuperSonics four games to two.

The team started with 50 wins in their first 60 games, but due to Bill Walton's foot injury they managed to go 8–14 the rest of the way. This would be Walton's last season with the club, as he sat out the 1979 season and then was signed by the San Diego Clippers.

The Blazers eventually eclipsed their franchise-record win total from this season with a 59–23 showing in 1989–90.

Draft picks

Note:  This is not a complete list; only the first two rounds are covered, as well as any other picks by the franchise who played at least one NBA game.

Roster

Regular season

Season standings

z – clinched division title
y – clinched division title
x – clinched playoff spot

Record vs. opponents

Playoffs

|- align="center" bgcolor="#ffcccc"
| 1
| April 18
| Seattle
| L 95–104
| Johnny Davis (20)
| Bill Walton (16)
| Lionel Hollins (9)
| Memorial Coliseum12,666
| 0–1
|- align="center" bgcolor="#ccffcc"
| 2
| April 21
| Seattle
| W 96–93
| Maurice Lucas (19)
| Maurice Lucas (14)
| Lionel Hollins (5)
| Memorial Coliseum12,666
| 1–1
|- align="center" bgcolor="#ffcccc"
| 3
| April 23
| @ Seattle
| L 84–99
| Tom Owens (24)
| Owens, Lucas (9)
| Dave Twardzik (5)
| Seattle Center Coliseum14,098
| 1–2
|- align="center" bgcolor="#ffcccc"
| 4
| April 26
| @ Seattle
| L 98–100
| Lionel Hollins (35)
| Maurice Lucas (16)
| Tom Owens (8)
| Seattle Center Coliseum14,098
| 1–3
|- align="center" bgcolor="#ccffcc"
| 5
| April 30
| Seattle
| W 113–89
| Tom Owens (31)
| Maurice Lucas (13)
| Davis, Owens (6)
| Memorial Coliseum12,666
| 2–3
|- align="center" bgcolor="#ffcccc"
| 6
| May 1
| @ Seattle
| L 94–105
| Johnny Davis (23)
| Maurice Lucas (12)
| Lionel Hollins (9)
| Seattle Center Coliseum14,098
| 2–4
|-

Player statistics

Season

Playoffs

Awards and honors
 Bill Walton, NBA Most Valuable Player Award
 Bill Walton, All-NBA First Team
 Bill Walton, NBA All-Defensive First Team
 Bill Walton, NBA All-Star
 Maurice Lucas, NBA All-Defensive First Team
 Maurice Lucas, NBA All-Star
 Lionel Hollins, NBA All-Defensive First Team
 Lionel Hollins, NBA All-Star
 Bob Gross, NBA All-Defensive Second Team

References

Portland Trail Blazers seasons
Portland
Portland Trail Blazers 1977
Portland Trail Blazers 1977
Portland
Portland